Edward Mason Eggleston (22 November 1882 – 14 January 1941) was an American painter who specialized in calendar portraits of women, fashionable and fantastic. He was also a well known commercial illustrator doing work for companies such as the Fisk Tire Company,  the Pennsylvania Railroad, and the Great Lakes Exposition.

He attended the Columbus Art School in Columbus, Ohio and moved to New York about 1915, where he worked to illustrate magazine covers, travel posters, advertisements and calendars. He worked primarily with oil paints on canvas, and also with pastels, water colors, and gouache.

Eggleston tapped into an American trend toward escapist fantasy during the Great Depression years of the 1930s. Described as "storytelling," his calendar works focused on women in stylish and fashionable dresses and hats, swimwear, or costumed as Native-American women, "Egyptian goddesses," pirate girls, and women in the character of Peter Pan.

Style and the Golden Age of Illustration
Eggleston painted to create illustrations. He was a successful illustrator during the 1920s and 1930s, a period included in the Golden Age of Illustration.

Such illustrators also include Leonora Goddard and James Arthur, Rudolph F. Ingerle, Jules Erbit, McClelland Barclay, C. Allan Gilbert, C. Warde Traver, Clarence F. Underwood, Hamilton King, Frederick Duncan, Henry Clive, J. Ross Bryson, Zoe Mozert, Frank Desch, Philip Boileau, J. Knowles Hare, Adelaide Hiebel, Zula Kenyon, Bradshaw Crandell, Rolf Armstrong, Earl Christy, Penrhyn Stanlaws, Coles Phillips, Valentine Sandberg, Neysa McMein, Haskell Coffin, and Gene Pressler.

The work of these artists, Eggleston included, was influenced by what would sell to the American public. While boundaries were pushed with some images, such as in areas of nudity and sexuality, publishers sought images that would sell.
One aspect of Modernism (of which Art Deco is part) was that artists were resisting a status quo. It meant an artist deciding for himself or herself what standards he would aspire to achieve. By the very nature of illustration, art in which a publisher or editor has a say, the artist's deciding for himself the standards he will meet is limited.

Early life and education
Eggleston  was born in Ashtabula, Ohio.  By his late teens, he was living in Columbus, and was  counted there in US Census in 1900.

He attended the Columbus Art School. Among his teachers for his "early training" were John N. Piersche (taught drawing at North High School), Alice Schille (studied in Paris, taught  drawing, watercolor and composition at Columbus Art  School), Albert C. Fauley (studied in Paris, teacher at Columbus Art School), and Harriet L. Dunn (painter active in Columbus, New York, Philadelphia, Boston & Chicago).

About age 22, he entered his art in the Ohio State Fair in Columbus in 1901 and 1902, winning five awards each year. In April 1903, he held an exhibition at the Columbus Pen and Pencil club, showing 30 of his paintings.

He was married in Montgomery, Ohio in 1907 to Ethel Grace Leland. Around 1908, they moved to Rochester, New York, where he was listed as a "designer" in the 1909 and 1910 city directory.

For several years, he worked for others. He listed himself as an artist beginning in the 1910  census and 1911 Rochester city directory. Some of the work was for a commercial engraver in  Rochester. Also, he may have worked for a printer from 1915 to 1917 in New York City; there is overlap where his name began to appear in both city directories in 1915. In 1916, Rochester’s directory reported him as having moved to New York City.

By 1918, Eggleston established his own business in Brooklyn, describing himself as a commercial illustrator in his registration for the draft.

Commercial 

Eggleston created artwork for use in magazines. The work can be broadly categorized as illustrations for stories  and advertisements.

His work for Chase Velmo upholstery, used for car seats, showed women (and a few men) admiring  or luxuriating in the upholstery of the automobile.  He created artwork for Willys-Knight, Gardner, Cadillac, Kissel, Studebaker, and Buick, showing the luxury of the car interiors and exteriors.

He  created advertisement illustrations for household consumer products, including Dagget and Ramsdell's Perfect Cold Cream, Frostilla Fragrant Lotion, Fleur de Lis blouses, Munsingwear hosiery, Glenwood stoves, Nufashond Laces, P. N. Practical Front Corsets, Pompeian Beauty Powder, Royal Worcester Corsets, Startex towels, Tetlow's Pussywillow Talc, True Shape Hosiery, Unfruit Bananas, Vitex Ribbon, and Welsbach Gas Heaters.

Better known works
In 1916, Eggleston created an iconic painting for the Fisk Tire Company, one of a number of illustrations the company used to show its advertising icon, a boy with a tire. Eggleston's  painting was printed,  the print varnished to resemble a painting, and hung in Fisk tire stores. He also created the art for a Great Lakes Exposition advertisement in 1937, used on "millions of posters and booklets." He also did an Art Deco series of paintings  featuring  railroad destinations for the Pennsylvania Railroad.

He produced art for calendar makers, including the American Art Works Calendar Company, Artographic (aka F.M. Turner), Beatrice Decker (B. D. Litho Company), Brown and Bigelow, Louis F. Dow, the Knapp company, the Thomas D. Murphy Calendar Company, and F. A. Schneider. His images were also used for jigsaw puzzles, by manufacturer brands including Perfect Picture, Madmar, Mayfair, Tuco, Harter Jiggety Jig, Zig-Zag and Dee Gee.

List of works

Fashionable

1914, girl with fishing pole
1916 woman with skis
1916 woman with iceskates
 1919 "The Sweetheart of Sigma Chi" or 1920 "Dixie"
1925 Portrait,  jewelry catalog
1926 "The Opera Queen"
1927 "Hello" or "Night and the stars are calling"
1928 "Moonlight and You"
1928 "The Valentine Girl"
1928 "Wonderful One'"
1929 "Memories"
1929 "Golden Glory"
1929 "Sunshine"
1930 "Going Up"
1930 "Here I Am"
1930 "Vacation Days"  woman in a red swimsuit calendar photo
1932 "A Day in June", girl and butterfly
1931"Top 'O the World", Woman with horse, '30s
1932 girl picking flowers under blue sky
1933 "A-milking we will go"
1933 "Found"
1934 "On Time"
1934 "Girl in Red Gown"
1934 "Moonlight and Roses"
1937 "Lantern Glow"
1937 "Tambourine Dancer"
1938 "A Bonnie Lassie"
1938 "Orchids"bottom of print: "Orchids" auction report: Edward M. Eggleston (1883-1941) Original Pin-up / Glamour Art (c.1930).
Published as a calendar print. Original works by this artist are exceedingly uncommon, especially in this medium. Pastel on board, framed (31.5 x 25.5), sight size approximately 27 x 21. Signed lower left.
1939 "Riding High" woman on horseback in front of red cliff
"The Beauty"

 Fantasy

c. 1925 "Isle of Dreamy Melodies"
1927 "Indian Love Call"
1929 "Pirate Queen of the Deck"
1929 "Starlight"
1929 "Bringing Home the Treasure"VTG BROWN & BIGELOW MINT PRINT EDWARD EGGLESTON WOMAN PIRATE TINTOGRAVURE
1930 "Pipes of Pan" or "Melody"
1930 "Princess of the Treasure Isle"
1931 "Evening Star"
1931 "Nymph and Frog" or "Enchantment"
Couple sits looking at images in distance
1931 "Peter Pan" standing on rock
1931 "Queen of the Waves"
1932 Fantasy castle landscape
1932/33 "Flame of the Mesa"
1932 "Red Wing"
1932 "The Treasure Princess"
1933 "Mariquita" or "Spanish Dancer"
1933 "Softly play the Pipes of Pan"
1933 "The Proposal" or "Hearts Unmasked", c 1933
1933 "Midnight Ride of Paul Revere, 1933
1933 "Reaching for the Moon"https://www.worthpoint.com/worthopedia/art-deco-print-reaching-moon-edward-498205912 '30s
1934 "The Paradise of Peter Pan" 1934 calendar with baby birds
1934 "Cleopatra"
 1935 "Peter Pan" with seagulls
1935 "Queen of the Mountain Tribes"
1936 "Flaming Arrow"
1936 "Playmates of Peter Pan"
1937 "Found"
1937 "Who,Who's There?" 1939 pinup
1938 "Lady of Mystery"
"Gypsy Love Call"
Dream Castle" or "Daydreams"

Still life or landscape

1932 Pillared terrace overlooks a fantasy castle across the water
1940s Lake Waterfall Cabin Salesman Sample Calendar Print

Travel posters and advertisements

1916 Fisk Tires Sleepy Boy
1935 Pennsylvania Railroad, Atlantic City, America's Great All Year Resort
1935 Pennsylvania Railroad, Atlantic City, America's All Year Resort
1935 Pennsylvania Railroad, Atlantic City, America's Greatest Seashore Resort
1935 Pennsylvania Railroad, Washington, The City Beautiful
1937 Billy Rose's Aquacade, Great Lakes Exposition
1937 Great Lakes Exposition

Puzzles

Bessie Nowell, "Bringing Home the Treasure"
Buckingham Jig Picture Puzzle, "Princess of the Treasure Isle"
Detroit Gasket and Manufacturing Company, Dee-Gee puzzles, "Flame  of the Mesa"
Detroit Gasket and Manufacturing Company, Dee-Gee puzzles, "Isle of Dreamy Melodies"
Detroit Gasket and Manufacturing Company, Dee-Gee puzzles, "Starlight"
Detroit Gasket and Manufacturing Company, Dee-Gee puzzles, "Treasure Princess
Einson-Freeman Company, "The Proposal"
Harter Jiggety Jig, "Princess of Treasure Isle"
Jumble Jig Saw Puzzles, "Princess of the Treasure Isle"
 Louis F. Dow Company Jig Zag puzzle, "Evening Star"
Parker Brothers, "Paradise of Peter Pan"
Madmar Quality Company, Inc, "Indian Love Call"
Royal Picture Puzzle, "Gypsy Love Call"
Tuco Workshops, Inc., Tuco puzzle, "Cleopatra"
Tuco Workshops, Inc., Tuco puzzle, "Paul Revere's Ride"
Unknown maker, "Queen of the Dock"

Gallery
 See: Edward Mason Eggleston at Wikimedia Commons for more complete gallery''

Citations

General sources
Publication: Artists in Ohio, 1787-1900, a biographical dictionary,  Author: Mary Sayre Haverstock Edition/Format: Article: Biography: State or province government publication: English, OCLC Number: 139306892
 Author: Mantle Fielding Edition/Format: Article: Biography: English Publication: Mantle Fielding's Dictionary of American painters, sculptors & engravers. OCLC Number: 70172637
Lady of Mystery: A Collector's Guide to Edward Eggleston by Norman I. Platnick. The author passed away and his son put this book online for free. He asks a donation to his memory from those that find it useful.

External links
 1916. Eggleston painting used by Fisk Tire Company, featuring Edward M. Eggleston's son, Leland Eggleston.
Mother and infant portrait
"Peter Pan", artwork, 1935.
"Playmates of Peter Pan", calendar, 1936."

1882 births
1941 deaths
American male painters
Fantasy artists
Painters from Ohio
Artists from New York City
Pin-up artists
American magazine illustrators